Chépica is a Chilean town and commune in Colchagua Province, O'Higgins Region.

Demographics
Of these, 6,949 (50.1%) lived in urban areas and 6,908 (49.9%) in rural areas. The population fell by 1.7% (244 persons) between the 1992 and 2002 censuses.

Administration
As a commune, Chépica is a third-level administrative division of Chile administered by a municipal council, headed by an alcalde who is directly elected every four years. The 2021-24 alcalde is Fabián Soto.

References

Communes of Chile
Populated places in Colchagua Province